Dastgerdu (also Romanized as Dastgerdū and Dast Gerdow; also known as Dastgerd) is a village in Tudeshk Rural District, Kuhpayeh District, Isfahan County, Isfahan Province, Iran. At the 2006 census, its population was 11, in 8 families.

References 

Populated places in Isfahan County